Bracey Arman Wright (born July 1, 1984) is a former American professional basketball player.

Amateur career
Wright attended The Colony High School in The Colony, Texas. He was a high school teammate of future NBA guard Deron Williams. He was a 2002 McDonald's All American. After being highly recruited out of high school, Wright played college basketball for the Indiana University Hoosiers from 2002–2004.

He scored 1,498 career points at Indiana and made 186 career three-pointers. Wright was named to the First Team All-Big Ten in 2004. As a junior, Wright led the Big Ten in scoring (18.3 points per game), while posting 25 or more points on seven occasions.

College statistics

|-
| style="text-align:left;"| 2002–03
| style="text-align:left;"| Indiana
| 30 || 30 || 33.6 || .433 || .375 || .752 || 5.0 || 2.1 || .8 || .6 || 16.2
|-
| style="text-align:left;"| 2003–04
| style="text-align:left;"| Indiana
| 29 || 29 || 38.3 || .374 || .343 || .789 || 5.4 || 2.4 || .9 || .5 || 18.5
|-
| style="text-align:left;"| 2004–05
| style="text-align:left;"| Indiana
| 26 || 26 || 35.3 || .413 || .329 || .783 || 4.8 || 2.7 || 1.1 || .6 || 18.3

|- class="sortbottom"
| style="text-align:center;" colspan="2"| Career
| 85 || 85 || 35.7 || .405 || .350 || .776 || 5.1 || 2.4 || .9 || .6 || 17.6

Professional career
Wright left Indiana for the NBA after three seasons. He was drafted by the Minnesota Timberwolves in the 2005 NBA Draft. The Timberwolves assigned him to the Florida Flame of the D-League for the 2005-06 season. He spent one more year in Minnesota.

On July 31, 2007, he signed with the Greek club Aris. In 2010, Wright signed a deal with Belgian Base Oostende for the remainder of the season. He was signed in the off season by Paris-Levallois in the French Pro A League and found a role as the starting shooting guard and back up point guard. In January 2011, he signed with Cedevita in Croatia. He was named to the All-EuroCup Second Team, and finished in 3rd place at the 2010–11 EuroCup Final 4 Championship with his team Cedevita. Wright was also the Quarterfinals Game 2 MVP for the 2010–11 Eurocup Finals. In July 2011, he signed with CAI Zaragoza in Spain. He returned to KK Cedevita in July 2012. In September 2013, he signed with Krasnye Krylia.

In January 2014, Wright signed with Hapoel Jerusalem for the rest of the season. In July 2014, he re-signed with Hapoel for three more years. In the 2014–15 season, Wright averaged 13.9 points, along with 3.4 rebounds and 3.2 assists, in the 26 Israeli Super League games in which he played. In the 2015 Super League Finals, in which he faced off against Hapoel Eilat, he averaged 19 points per game, and was named the finals MVP.

On August 3, 2016, Wright signed with Acıbadem Üniversitesi.

On July 4, 2017, Wright signed with Turkish club Büyükçekmece Basketbol.

International career
Wright was a member of the gold-medal winning USA World Championship for Young Men Qualifying Team at the 2004 FIBA Americas World Championships.

Personal life
Wright has 4 children Bracey Jr, Bailey and Bella, along with a stepdaughter. Wright is the son of SMU basketball great Carl Wright. Wright has a great appreciation for the world of football (soccer) and is an avid member of the Juventus fan club. He is also known to enjoy cooking, fitness and reading. Wright now resides full-time in Europe.

References

External links

 VTB League profile
 NBA.com Profile

 Euroleague.net Profile
 ACB.com Profile

1984 births
Living people
ABA League players
African-American basketball players
American expatriate basketball people in Belgium
American expatriate basketball people in Croatia
American expatriate basketball people in the Czech Republic
American expatriate basketball people in France
American expatriate basketball people in Greece
American expatriate basketball people in Israel
American expatriate basketball people in Russia
American expatriate basketball people in Spain
American men's basketball players
Aris B.C. players
Basketball players from Texas
Basket Zaragoza players
BC Krasnye Krylia players
BC Oostende players
Büyükçekmece Basketbol players
Basketball Nymburk players
Florida Flame players
Greek Basket League players
Hapoel Jerusalem B.C. players
Joventut Badalona players
Indiana Hoosiers men's basketball players
Karşıyaka basketball players
KK Cedevita players
Liga ACB players
McDonald's High School All-Americans
Minnesota Timberwolves draft picks
Minnesota Timberwolves players
Parade High School All-Americans (boys' basketball)
Metropolitans 92 players
People from The Colony, Texas
Point guards
Shooting guards
Sportspeople from the Dallas–Fort Worth metroplex
21st-century African-American sportspeople
20th-century African-American people